Springville is an unincorporated community in Susquehanna County, Pennsylvania, United States. Springville has a post office with ZIP code 18844, which opened on September 19, 1815.

References

Unincorporated communities in Susquehanna County, Pennsylvania
Unincorporated communities in Pennsylvania